Jangseong station is a KTX station in Jangseong County, South Korea. It is on the Honam Line.

External links
 Cyber station information from Korail

Railway stations in South Jeolla Province
Jangseong County
Railway stations opened in 1914
Korea Train Express stations